The men's 2000 metres steeplechase event at the 1986 World Junior Championships in Athletics was held in Athens, Greece, at Olympic Stadium on 18 and 20 July.

Medalists

Results

Final
20 July

Heats
18 July

Heat 1

Heat 2

Participation
According to an unofficial count, 34 athletes from 23 countries participated in the event.

References

2000 metres steeplechasechase
Steeplechase at the World Athletics U20 Championships